Yulduz Usmonova (born December 12, 1963) is an Uzbek singer, song-writer, composer and actress. She is the People's artist of Uzbekistan and honored artist of Kazakhstan, Turkmenistan and Tajikistan. She has achieved widespread fame in Uzbekistan, other parts of Central Asia, and more recently in Turkey. Usmonova has also acted in a number of Uzbek films.

Yulduz Usmonova was born in Margilan in the Ferghana region of Uzbekistan. Her parents worked at a silk factory. She studied music at the pedagogical institute in Margilan.

She was discovered by Gavharxonim Rahimova after singing at a Women’s Day show. Rahimova helped to open many doors for Usmanova. After being introduced to professors from the Uzbekistan State Conservatory, she prepared under their guidance. She studied vocal, and then later became a popular singer in Uzbekistan after independence in 1991. She became famous throughout Central Asia and later in Turkey and has released songs in many languages, such as Uzbek, Uyghur, Turkish, Russian, Tajik, Arabic, Kazakh, Chinese, Indian and Tatar.

Filmography

Discography
Studio albums
 1993: Alma Alma
 1995: Jannona
 1996: Binafscha
 1999: Oqqan daryo oqaveradi
 1999: Yulduz
 2001: Buncha go'zal bu hayot
 2001: Oshiqlik
 2002: Yoshligim, beboshligim
 2003: Mendan meni so'rama
 2003: О Любви
 2004: Men o'zimni topmasam
 2005: Yondiraman, yonaman
 2005: Ayol
 2005: Биё, Жонам
 2006: Faqat sabr tiladim
 2007: Kerak bo'lsa jonim fido
 2007: O'zbekiston — qanday bo'lsang shunday sevaman
 2008: Inadim
 2009: Dunya
 2009: Sen ham asra, ko'zmunchog'ingman
 2010: Tilimdan emas dilimdan
 2010: Kible Benim Kalbimde
 2011: Bir Şans Ver
 2019: Men seni sevaman

Videography
 (1991) “Aylanma“
 (1991) “Qizil olma”
 (2000) “Sevgilim“ (feat. Ruslan Sharipov)
 (2001) “Nozanin” (feat. Ruslan Sharipov)
 (2003) “Mendan meni so'rama“
 (2003) “Senga”
 (2004) “Qalb”
 (2004) “Men kimman ayt”
 (2004) “O'g'il bola”
 (2005) “Biyo jonam biyo” (In Tajik)
 (2005) “Ko'rmasam bo'lmas”
 (2005) “Nadur” (feat. Akron Ibodullaev)
 (2005) “Sevaman seni” (feat. Davron Ergashev)
 (2006) “Bevafo yorim”
 (2006) “Iymon”
 (2006) “Jon me bari jon” (In Tajik)
 (2006) “Muhabbat”
 (2006) “Oh dilame” (In Tajik)
 (2006) “Sog'inch”
 (2006) “Тик так” (In Russian)
 (2006) “Ангел мой” (In Russian)
 (2007) “Dadajon”
 (2007) “O'p - o'p”
 (2007) “Oq kema”
 (2007) “Yana bahor”
 (2007) “Любовь моя” (feat. the band "Dostar") (In Russian)
 (2008) “Affet Allahim” (In Turkish)
 (2008) “Babacim” (In Turkish)
 (2008) “Öp”  (In Turkish)
 (2008) “Salovat”
 (2008) “Shekilli”
 (2009) “Görmesem Olmaz” (feat Fatih Erkoç)
 (2009) “Yalan”ya (In Turkish)
 (2010) “Beni kovma kalbinden” (In Turkish)
 (2010) “Seni severdim" (In Turkish)
 (2010) “Yalvar guzel Allah`a” (In Turkish)
 (2010) “Yolvor go'zal Allohga”
 (2011) “Aldadi” (feat. Atham Yuldashev)
 (2011) “Aynanayin”
 (2011) “Belli belli” (In Turkish)
 (2011) “Dunya” (In Turkish)
 (2011) “Ey yor” (In Tajik)
 (2011) “Ko'z yoshim oqar”
 (2018) "Yalli-yalli"
 (2019) "Taralli dalli"

 (2022) "Muhabbat"
 (2022) "Yor biyo"
 (2022) "Bu sevgi"

References

External links

Yulduz Usmanova's Music on Tmhits.com

1963 births
Living people
People from Margilan
Uzbeks
Uzbekistani film actresses
Usmanova
20th-century Uzbekistani women singers
Turkish-language singers
Kazakh-language singers
Tatar-language singers
Arabic-language singers
Tajik-language singers
20th-century Uzbekistani actresses
21st-century Uzbekistani actresses